Lillian Smith may refer to:

Lillian Smith (author) (1897–1966), American author Strange Fruit 1944
Lillian Smith Book Award
Lillian Smith (trick shooter) (1871–1930), American trick shooter with Buffalo Bill
Lillian Rita Smith (1912–1993), New Zealand communist
Lillian H. Smith (1887–1983), Canadian children's librarian